The 2023 Philadelphia Union season  is the club's fourteenth season in Major League Soccer, the top flight of American soccer. The team is managed by Jim Curtin, his tenth season with the club. The club's regular season began on February 25, 2023, and will conclude on October 9. Outside of MLS, Philadelphia will participate in the U.S. Open Cup, the CONCACAF Champions League, and the Leagues Cup.

Previous season 

The club finished second in the Supporters' Shield standings and first in the Eastern Conference. The Union appeared in their first MLS Cup, where they lost to Shield winners Los Angeles FC in a penalty shootout.

Non-competitive

Preseason exhibitions

Competitive

Major League Soccer

Standings

Eastern Conference

Overall table

Regular season

U.S. Open Cup

CONCACAF Champions League

Round of 16

Quarter-finals

Leagues Cup

Group stage

Standings

Results

References

External links 

Philadelphia Union
Philadelphia Union seasons
Philadelphia Union
Philadelphia Union